International King of Sports is a multi-sport competition held yearly. The events were unusual sports rarely undertaken outside of this competition and were often variants of standard track and field sports.

Adam Horder (AUS) was the winner in 2002. The winner of the 2004 competition was Jamie Quarry (GBR).

Events
There are seven heats, each made up of five of the following events. Each heat has four competitors. The winner from each heat goes through to the final, along with the highest-scoring runner-up, to give eight contestants.

3-metre Sprint
The 3-metre sprint is similar to the 100-metre sprint; however, it takes place over a three-metre distance. The races last under a second and require a photo finish to determine who has won. Two false starts lead to disqualification from the event.

10G human slalom
Contestants run downhill, taking a zigzag course through ten gates, each composed of a pair of flags on pole. They are allowed to touch the flags, but they must not be knocked down.

The course for the 2004 competition is designed with the first half of the course being steep, requiring nimbleness and technique as much as speed, while the second half allows the contestants to run faster.

Association bobbage
Contestants wearing flippers jump into a swimming pool from a platform, the height of which is gradually raised. The aim is to land without your head going underwater. The world record is currently held by Laszlo 'The Human Dolphin' Fazekas (Hungary) and is 2.40 m.

Backwards 200 m
This is a 200 m race in which the contestants run backwards. They must stay within their appointed lane.

Individual fall down
Contestants have to fall to the floor as fast as possible from a standing position. For a fall to be valid the contestant's head must make contact with a cushioned pressure-sensitive pad on the floor. The event is run as a knockout with the slowest contestant in each round being eliminated, until one winner is left.

Headlong dive
This event takes place on a long jump track and pit. Rather than landing feet first, contestants jump headlong; if their feet touch the sand, their effort is a no-jump.  Liam Collins who jumped a world record 8.96 m. The jump itself cannot be classed as a world track and field record as the head long technique is not permitted in actual Olympic Games.

Double footed over-hurdles
Contestants must keep both feet together and clear 10 hurdles on the 110m hurdles track.

In 2002, Kengo Shiomi (JPN) won this event in the heats, despite never having taken part in the event before.

International skids
Contestants take a short run-up to a lubricant-coated track, on which they skid. Skids only count if the contestant does not fall over.

The lubricant coating of the track was changed for the 2004 competition, from olive oil to xanthan gum. This led to the world record being broken three times in the first heat. The current record is held by Brian Clark (GB), and is around 55 metres.

Pool hang
Contestants must hang onto a bar suspended above a swimming pool for as long as possible. They can only use their hands to grip the bar. The event is done as a knockout with contestants competing in pairs. The winning contestants in the heats meet in a final to decide first place, with the losers competing for third place.

Tennis whack
This event has contestants competing using a tennis racquet and a tennis ball. The aim is to see who can hit the ball vertically up in the air the longest time. This is measured in seconds. This is also sometimes known as "Screeding".

Speed-gun run
Contestants sprint down a twenty-metre track; their speed is measured close to the end, just before they run into an upright crash mat. The current world record of 20.27 mph (32.62 km/h) is held by Hugo 'The Human Rhino' Mybergh (RSA).

Under hurdles
This event is identical to the 110 metres hurdles track event, except that the competitors must go under the horizontal bar of the hurdle instead of over it. This makes the event more difficult, and the times taken to complete the course are greater than standard hurdling times. International hurdler Liam Collins smashed the world record dipping his way to a staggering 19.62.

Underwater shot put
This is identical to the track and field event, shot put (throwing a ball with a pushing motion), except that it takes place under water. Rather than being made of metal, the shot used is a leather ball filled with sand. Competitors can achieve distances of 4 m and more.

Uphill long jump

Vertical standing jump
Contestants must jump from standing onto a table-like platform. There is no run-up, and no bouncing is allowed; momentum is gained primarily through swinging the arms. The contestants' feet – and not their knees – must touch the platform first. The current world record was set at 137.5 centimetres by Jean Piers (RSA) who is now the proud owner of CrossFit TW18 in Staines, Surrey, UK.

Water jump
From a short run-up, contestants jump from a springboard over a horizontal pole into a swimming pool. Unlike the high jump, which this event resembles, contestants tend to favour a face-down dive over the bar, sometimes with a somersault. The world record is 180 centimetres, and was set in the 2003 competition by William Pobie (GB), a man who couldn't swim.

2002 competition

Episode 1 – Heat 1
 Original airdate: 
 Viewership: 
  Event 1 – Double Footed Over Hurdles:In lane one was German Thorsten Richter with a P.B. of 33.14 and in lane two was South African Hugo Myburgh with a P.B. of 31.13 and in lane three was Great Briton Nathan Strange with a P.B. of 32.83 and in lane four was Japanese Kengo Shiomi who never competed in this event before. Shiomi who had a slight slip on the first hurdle won the race with a time of 30.90 seconds while the runner up was Strange with a time of 32.19 seconds and in a close race to avoid finishing last, Myburgh, who had a close race with Strange in the first six hurdles before falling in the seventh hurdle came third with a time of 35.09 seconds with Richter coming last with a time of 35.14 seconds.
 Double Footed Over Hurdles result: 1st  Kengo Shiomi 30.90 seconds – 2nd  Nathan Strange 32.19 seconds – 3rd  Hugo Myburgh 35.09 seconds – 4th  Thorsten Richter 35.14 seconds
 After 1 event: 1st  Kengo Shiomi 4 points – 2nd  Nathan Strange 3 points – 3rd  Hugo Myburgh two points – 4th  Thorsten Richter 1 point
 Event 2 – Speed Gun Run: First on the first attempt was Great Briton Nathan Strange who blew into the speed gun at a speed of 19.60 miles per hour. Next was South African Hugo Myburgh who blew into the speed gun at a speed of 19.66 miles per hour. Next was Japanese Kengo Shiomi who blew into the speed gun at a speed of 18.29 miles per hour. Last up was German Thorsten Richter who blew into the speed gun at a speed of 17.90 miles per hour. First on the second attempt was Great Briton Nathan Strange who blew into the speed gun at a speed of 19.35 miles per hour while South African Hugo Myburgh blew into the speed gun at a speed of 20.05 miles per hour.
 Speed Gun Run result: 1st  Hugo Myburgh 20.05 miles per hour – 2nd  Nathan Strange 19.35-mile per hour – 3rd  Kengo Shiomi 18.29 miles per hour – 4th  Thorsten Richter 17.90 miles per hour
 After 2 events: Three way tie for first  Kengo Shiomi,  Nathan Strange and  Hugo Myburgh all on 3 points – 4th  Thorsten Richter
 Event 3 – Water Jump: In the 1.40 m, German Thorsten Richter, Japanese Kengo Shiomi and South African Hugo Myburgh successfully avoided the bar but Great Briton Nathan Strange's feet as he was diving into the water touched the bar and failed. In the 1.50 m, German Thorsten Richter's touched the bar and failed but Japanese Kengo Shiomi and South African Hugo Myburgh successfully avoided the bar. In the 1.60 m, Japanese Kengo Shiomi successfully avoided the bar but South African Hugo Myburgh's knee hit the bar and failed.
 Water Jump result: 1st  Kengo Shiomi 1.60 m – 2nd  Hugo Myburgh 1.50 m – 3rd  Thorsten Richter 1.30 m – 4th  Nathan Strange 1.20
 After 3 events: 1st  Kengo Shiomi 10 points – 2nd  Hugo Myburgh 9 points – 3rd  Nathan Strange 7 points – 4th  Thorsten Richter 4 points
 Event 4 – 10G Human Slalom: First up was German Thorsten Richter who completed the course in 40.00 seconds with no penalties. Next was South African Hugo Myburgh who completed the course in 44.31 seconds with no penalties. Next was Japanese Kengo Shiomi who completed the course in 42.00 seconds with no penalties. Last was Great Briton Nathan Strange who completed the course in 38.10 seconds with no penalties.
 10G Human Slalom result: 1st  Nathan Strange 38.10 seconds – 2nd  Thorsten Richter 40.00 seconds – 3rd  Kengo Shiomi 42.00 seconds – 4th  Hugo Myburgh 44.31 seconds
 After 4 events:  1st  Kengo Shiomi 12 points – 2nd  Nathan Strange 11 points – 3rd  Hugo Myburgh 10 points – 4th  Thorsten Richter 7 points
 Event 5 – Headlong Dive: On the first attempt, South African Hugo Myburgh's dive was discounted after his feet crossed the red line while Great Briton Nathan Strange dived 7.53 meters. On the second attempt, Japanese Kengo Shiomi dived 6.79 meters while South African Hugo Myburgh's dive was again discounted, this time, his left foot touch the sand and the same happened to Great Briton Nathan Strange. On the third attempt, South African Hugo Myburgh's dive was once more discounted as his left feet crossed the red line while Great Briton Nathan Strange dived 7.05 meters.
 Headlong Dive result: 1st  Kengo Shiomi 8.29 meters – 2nd  Nathan Strange 7.53 meters – 3rd  Thorsten Richter 6.81 meters – 4th  Hugo Myburgh ---
 Result after 5 events: 1st  Kengo Shiomi 16 points – 2nd  Nathan Strange 14 points – 3rd  Hugo Myburgh 11 points – 4th  Thorsten Richter

2004 competition

Episode 1 – Heat 1
 Original airdate: 
 Viewership: 
 Contestants: 

  Event 1 – Back Sprint:In lane one was Brazilian Rodrigo Peres and in lane two was Australian Adam Horder and in lane three was Great Briton Brian Clark and in lane four was American Milek Jivens. In a close race for first, Clark pipped Horder with the Great Briton winning with a time of 38.33 seconds with the Australian second at a time of 38.38 seconds. Jivens came third with a time of 38.57 seconds and Peres coming last with a time of 42.81 seconds.
 Back Sprint result: 1st  Brian Clark 38.33 seconds – 2nd  Adam Horder 38.38 seconds – 3rd  Milek Jivens 38.57 seconds – 4th  Rodrigo Peres 42.81 seconds
 After 1 event: 1st  Brian Clark 4 points – 2nd  Adam Horder 3 points – 3rd  Milek Jivens 2 points – 4th  Rodrigo Peres 1 point
 Event 2 – Men's Individual Fall Down: From left to right, Brazilian Rodrigo Peres, Australian Adam Horder, Great Briton Brian Clark and American Milek Jivens. In the first shot, Clark landed first with Peres landing second and Horder landing third and Jivens landing last eliminating him. In the second shot, Horder landed first with Clark landing second and Peres landing last eliminating him. In the third and final shot, Horder landed faster than Clark
 Men's Individual Fall Down result: 1st  Adam Horder 4 – 2nd  Brian Clark 3 – 3rd  Rodrigo Peres 2 – 4th  Milek Jivens 1
 After 2 events: Tie for 1st  Adam Horder and  Brian Clark both on 7 points – Tie for 3rd  Milek Jivens and  Rodrigo Peres both on 3 points
 Event 3 – Endurance Pool Hang: In the first set, there was Brazilian Rodrigo Peres and American Milek Jivens and Jivens fell off first while Great Briton Brian Clark was up against Australian Adam Horder and Clark fell off first. In the 3rd place match, American Milek Jivens was up against Great Briton Brian Clark and although Clark tried to stay on, he fell off a minute and twenty six seconds in. In the final, Brazilian Rodrigo Peres was up against Australian Adam Horder where with over two minutes gone, Horder struggled to hold on and fell two minutes and eleven seconds in with Peres staying strong.
 Endurance Pool Hang result: 1st  Rodrigo Peres 4 – 2nd  Adam Horder 3 – 3rd  Milek Jivens 2 – 4th  Brian Clark 1
 After 3 events: 1st  Adam Horder 10 points – 2nd  Brian Clark 8 points – 3rd  Rodrigo Peres 7 points – 4th  Milek Jivens 5 points
 Event 4 – 10G Human Slalom: First up was Brazilian Rodrigo Peres who completed the course in 32.91 seconds with no penalties. Next was American Milek Jivens who completed the course in 35.53 seconds with no penalties. Next was Australian Adam Horder who completed the course in 33.66 seconds with no penalties. Last was Great Briton Brian Clark who completed the course in 33.27 seconds with no penalties.
 10G Human Slalom result: 1st  Rodrigo Peres 32.91 seconds – 2nd  Brian Clark 33.27 seconds – 3rd  Adam Horder 33.66 seconds – 4th  Milek Jivens 35.53 seconds
 After 4 events:  1st  Adam Horder 12 points – Tie for 2nd  Brian Clark and  Rodrigo Peres both on 11 points – 4th  Milek Jivens 6 points
 Event 5 – International Skids: On the first skid, Brazilian Rodrigo Peres went 33.35 meters while Great Briton Brian Clark went 47.57 meters which was a new world record only to be shattered by Australian Adam Horder who went 50.61 meters. On the third skid, Great Briton Brian Clark went 57.79 meters breaking Adam Horder's world record while Brazilian Rodrigo Peres went 27.17 meters while Australian Adam Horder went 50.89 meters.
 Result after 5 events: Tie for 1st  Brian Clark and  Adam Horder both on 15 points – 3rd  Rodrigo Peres 12 points – 4th  Milek Jivens 8 points

Episode 2 – Heat 2
 Original airdate: 
 Viewership: 
 Contestants: 

  Event 1 – 3m Sprint:In lane one was Japanese Yukio Matt-motto and in lane two was Hungarian Laszlo Fazekas and in lane three was South African Hugo Myburgh and in lane four was Great Briton James Christie. Christie came first with a time of 0.84 seconds with Myburgh second with a time of 0.87 seconds and Matt-motto third with a time of 0.91 seconds and Fazekas last with a time of 0.92 seconds.
 3m Sprint result: 1st  James Christie 0.84 seconds – 2nd  Hugo Myburgh 0.87 seconds – 3rd  Yukio Matt-motto 0.91 seconds – 4th  Laszlo Fazekas 0.92 seconds
 After 1 event: 1st  James Christie 4 points – 2nd  Hugo Myburgh 3 points – 3rd  Yukio Matt-motto 2 points – 4th  Laszlo Fazekas 1 point
 Event 2 – Water Jump: All four competitors avoided the bar in the 1.20 meters. In the seconds attempt, this time in the 1.40 meters, Japanese Yukio Matt-Motto's feet hit the bar and failed. In the first attempt at the 1.70-meter, Great Briton James Christie and South African Hugo Myburgh successfully avoided the bar. In the second attempt at the 1.70-meter, Hungarian Laszlo Fazekas feet touched the bar and failed. In the second attempt at the 1.80-meter, Great Briton James Christie's chest touched the bar and failed while South African Hugo Myburgh left knee touched the bar but not hard enough to knock it off and cleared.
 Water Jump result: 1st  Hugo Myburgh 4 – 2nd  James Christie 3 – 3rd  Laszlo Fazekas 2 – 4th  Yukio Matt-motto 1
 After 2 events: Tie for 1st  James Christie and  Hugo Myburgh both on 7 points – Tie for 3rd  Laszlo Fazekas and  Yukio Matt-motto both on 3 points
 Event 3 – Association Bobbage: In the 0.70-meter, Japanese Yukio Matt-motto, Great Briton James Christie and Hungarian Laszlo Fazekas kept their heads above the water but South African Hugo Muburgh's head was under the water and failed. In the seconds attempt at the 1.30-meter, Japanese Yukio Matt-motto's head was under the water and failed. In the first attempt at the 2.20-meter, Hungarian Laszlo Fazekas kept his head above the water and setting a new world record only to be shared by Great Briton James Christie whose kept his head above the water. In the first attempt at the 2.40-meter, Hungarian Laszlo Fazekas kept his head above the water and setting a new world record breaking the record shared by him and Great Briton James Christie where in the 2.40-meter, his head was under the water and failed.
 Association Bobbage result: 1st  Laszlo Fazekas 2.40 m – 2nd  James Christie 2.20 m – 3rd  Yukio Matt-motto 1.00 m – 4th  Hugo Myburgh X
 After 3 events: 1st  James Christie 10 points – 2nd  Hugo Myburgh 8 points – 3rd  Laszlo Fazekas 7 points – 4th  Yukio Matt-motto 5 points
 Event 4 – Speed Gun Run: In the first attempt, South African Hugo Myburgh blew into the speed gun at a speed of 18.88 miles per hour while Japanese Yukio Matt-motto blew into the speed gun at a speed of 18.07 miles per hour while Hungarian Laszlo Fazekas blew into the speed gun at a speed of 18.23 miles per hour while Great Briton James Christie blew into the speed gun at a speed of 20.19 miles per hour. In the second attempt, South African Hugo Myburgh blew into the speed gun at a speed of 20.27 miles per hour while Great Briton James Christie blew into the speed gun at a speed of 18.65 miles per hour
 Speed Gun Run result: 1st  Hugo Myburgh 20.27 miles per hour – 2nd  James Christie 20.19 miles per hour – 3rd  Laszlo Fazekas 19.34 miles per hour – 4th  Yukio Matt-motto 18.07 miles per hour
 After 4 events:  1st  James Christie 13 points – 2nd  Hugo Myburgh 12 points – 3rd  Laszlo Fazekas 9 points – 4th  Yukio Matt-motto 6 points
 Event 5 – Headlong Dive: On the first attempt, Hungarian Laszlo Fazekas dived at 7.07 meters while just like the last competition, South African Hugo Myburgh's dive was discounted as his left feet nearly fully on the green line while Great Briton James Christie's dive was discounted as his right feet touched the ground while jumping. On the second attempt, South African Hugo Myburgh's jump was yet again discounted, this time his left feet touched the green line while Great Briton James Christie dive at 6.38 meters. On the third attempt, South African Hugo Muburgh who finally avoided the green line and dived at 6.64 meters while Great Briton James Christie who dived 7.38 meters.
 Result after 5 events: 1st  James Christie 16 points – 2nd  Hugo Myburgh 14 points – 3rd  Laszlo Fazekas 13 points – 4th  Yukio Matt-motto 7 points

Episode 3 – Heat 3
 Original airdate: 
 Viewership: 
 Contestants: 

  Event 1 – 3m Sprint:In lane one was German Karl Schaefer and in lane two was Jamaican Joshua Wood and in lane three was South African Jean Piers and in lane four was Great Briton Iggy Singh. Schaefer and Wood went before the gun and the race had to be restarted. In the restarted race, Wood came first with a time of 0.96 seconds with Singh coming second with a time of 0.98 seconds and Piers coming third with a time of 0.99 seconds leaving Schaefer coming last with a time of 1.25 seconds
 3m Sprint result: 1st  Joshua Wood 0.96 seconds – 2nd  Iggy Singh 0.98 seconds – 3rd  Jean Piers 0.99 seconds – 4th  Karl Schaefer 1.25 seconds
 After 1 event: 1st  Joshua Wood 4 points – 2nd  Iggy Singh 3 points – 3rd  Jean Piers 2 points – 4th  Karl Schaefer 1 point
 Event 2 – Standing Vertical Leap: In the 1.10-meter, German Karl Schaefer's legs hit the celling and failed. In the first attempt at the 1.30-meter, South African Jean Piers and Jamaican Joshua Wood's feet successfully landed on the platform. In the second attempt at the 1.30-meter, Great Briton Iggy Singh's knees landed on the platform and failed. In the first attempt of the 1.325-meter, South African Jean Piers and Jamaican Joshua Wood's feet successfully landed on the platform. In the first attempt on the 1.35-meter, South African Jean Piers feet only just landed on the platform while Jamaican Joshua Wood's feet touched the side of the platform and slipped forwards with his knees landing on the platform and failed but succeeded on the second attempt. In the first attempt on the 1.375-meter, South African Jean Piers legs landed on the side of the platform but managed to pull himself away from the side while Jamaican Joshua Wood's successfully landed on the platform. In the second attempt on the 1.40-meter, South African Jean Piers knees landed on the platform and failed while Jamaican Joshua Wood's feet landed on the side of the platform and slipped forwards with his hands landing on the platform and failed.
 Standing Vertical Leap result: 1st  Jean Piers 4 – 2nd  Joshua Wood 3 – 3rd  Iggy Singh 2 – 4th  Karl Schaefer 1
 After 2 events: 1st  Joshua Wood 7 points – 2nd  Jean Piers 6 points – 3rd  Iggy Singh 5 points – 4th  Karl Schaefer 2 points
 Event 3 – Underwater Shot Put: In the first throw, German Karl Schaefer threw his ball at a distance of 3.52 meters while Jamaican Joshua Wood threw his ball at a distance of 2.57 meters while South African Jean Piers threw his ball at a distance of 3.22 meters while Great Briton Iggy Singh threw his ball at a distance of 2.33 meters. On the second throw, German Karl Schaefer threw his ball at a distance of 4.00 meters but Jamaican Joshua Wood's throw was discounted as when he was throwing his ball, his left feet went outside the black circle while South African Jean Piers threw his ball at a distance of 3.51 meters while Great Briton Iggy Singh threw his ball at a distance of 2.50 meters.
 Underwater Shot Put result: 1st  Karl Schaefer 4.08 meters – 2nd  Jean Piers 3.51 meters – 3rd  Joshua Wood 2.57 meters – 4th  Iggy Singh 2.50 meters
 After 3 events: Tie for 1st  Jean Piers and  Joshua Wood both on 9 points – Tie for 3rd  Karl Schaefer and  Iggy Singh both on 6 points
 Event 4 – 10G Human Slalom: First up was South African Jean Piers who completed the course in 34.82 seconds with no penalties. Next was Great Briton Iggy Singh who completed the course in 32.63 seconds with no penalties. Next was German Karl Schaefer who completed the course in 36.00 seconds with no penalties. Last was Jamaican Joshua Wood who completed the course in 31.65 seconds with no penalties.
 10G Human Slalom result: 1st  Joshua Wood 31.65 seconds – 2nd  Iggy Singh 32.63 seconds – 3rd  Jean Piers 34.82 seconds – 4th  Karl Schaefer 36.00 seconds
 After 4 events:  1st  Joshua Wood 13 points – 2nd  Jean Piers 11 points – 3rd  Iggy Singh 9 points – 4th  Karl Schaefer 7 points
 Event 5 – Headlong Dive: German Karl Schaefer had all three of his dives discounted after his feet crossed the green line. On the third attempt, Great Briton Iggy Singh dived at 8.75 meters setting a new world record. On the first attempt, Jamaican Joshua Wood dived at 6.50 meters while South African Jean Piers dived at 6.87 meters. In the second attempt, Jamaican Joshua Wood dived at 6.90 meters while South African Jean Piers dived at 7.58 meters. In the third attempt, Jamaican Joshua Wood dived at 7.94 meters while South African Jean Piers dive was discounted after his feet crossed the green line.
 Result after 5 events: 1st  Joshua Wood 16 points – Tie for 2nd  Jean Piers and  Iggy Singh both on 13 points – 4th  Karl Schaefer 8 points

Episode 4 – Heat 4
 Original airdate: 
 Viewership: 
 Contestants: 

  Event 1 – Back Sprint:In lane one was Swede Johan Hellstrom and in lane two was Great Briton Jamie Quarry and in lane three was Jamaican Leeman Stewart and in lane four was Indian Kunal Sharma. Quarry was the clear winner with a time of 33.78 seconds with Stewart coming with a time of ?.? seconds despite falling over at the finish and Hellstrom coming third with a time of ?.?
 Back Sprint result: 1st  Jamie Quarry 33.78 seconds – 2nd  Leeman Stewart 39.15 seconds – 3rd  Johan Hellstrom 40.00 seconds – 4th  Kunal Sharma 43.39 seconds
 After 1 event: 1st  Jamie Quarry 4 points – 2nd  Leeman Stewart 3 points – 3rd  Johan Hellstrom 2 points – 4th  Kunal Sharma 1 point
 Event 2 – Standing Vertical Leap: In the first attempt at the 1.20-meter, Great Briton Jamie Quarry's feet landed on the side of the platform but was able to leap onto the platform. Also in the 1.20-meter, Swede Johan Hellstrom's left knee landed on the side of the platform and failed but Jamaican Leeman Stewart's feet successfully landed on the platform. In his first attempt at the 1.20-meter, Indian Kunal Sharma's successfully landed on the platform and the same happened for his second attempt at the 1.20-meter. In the second attempt at the 1.25-meter, Great Briton Jamie Quarry's hit the side of the platform and tripped with his knees touching the platform and failed while Jamaican Leeman Stewart's feet successfully landed on the platform as did Indian Kunal Sharma. In the second attempt of the 1.30-meter, Jamaican Leeman Stewart's left feet touched the side of the platform and did not get up the platform and failed while Indian Kunal Shrma feet landed on the side of the platform and landed on the ground and failed. Setwart and Kunal both failed on the second attempt as their feet landed on the side of the platform and landed on the ground but on the third attempt, Stewart's feet successfully landed on the failed but Sharma could not.
 Standing Vertical Leap result: 1st  Leeman Stewart 4 – 2nd  Kunal Shrma 3 – 3rd  Jamie Quarry 2 – 4th  Johan Hellstrom 1
 After 2 events: 1st  Leeman Stewart 7 points – 2nd  Jamie Quarry 6 points – 3rd  Kunal Sharma 4 points – 4th  Johan Hellstrom 3 points
 Event 3 – Association Bobbage: In the first attempt on the 0.70-meter, Great Briton Jamie Quarry kept his head above the water as did Swede Johan Hellstrom but in the second attempt, Jamaican Leeman Stewart's head landed in the water and failed as did Indian Kunal Sharma. In the first attempt on the 1.30-meter, Great Briton Jamie Quarry kept his head above the water as did Swede Johan Hellstrom. In the first attempt on the 1.60-meter, Jamie Quarry kept his head above the water. In the second attempt on the 1.60-meter, Swede Johan Hellstrom's head landed in the water and failed.
 Association Bobbage result: 1st  Jamie Quarry 4 – 2nd  Johan Hellstrom 3 – Tie for 3rd  Leeman Stewart and  Kunal Sharma both 1.5
 After 3 events: 1st  Jamie Quarry 10 points – 2nd  Leeman Stewart 8.5 points – 3rd  Johan Hellstrom 6 points – 4th  Kunal Sharma 5.5 points
 Event 4 – Uphill Long Jump: Indian Kunal Sharma's first jump was 2.28 meters with his jump being 2.52 meters and his third jump being 2.66 meters while Swede Johan Hellstrom's jump first jump was 2.82 meters with his second jump being 2.88 meters and his third jump being 2.84 meters. In the second attempt, Jamaican Leeman Stewart whose first jump was 2.65 meters, jumped 3.18 meters while Great Briton Jamie Quarry, whose first jump was 3.22 meters had his second jump discounted after his left feet crossed the green line. On the third attempt, Jamaican Leeman Stewart jumped 3.44 meters while Great Briton Jamie Quarry jumped 3.23 meters.
 Uphill Long Jump result: 1st  Leeman Stewart 3.44 meters – 2nd  Jamie Quarry 3.23 meters – 3rd  Johan Hellstrom 2.88 meters – 4th  Kunal Sharma 2.66 meters
 After 4 events: 1st  Jamie Quarry 13 points – 2nd  Leeman Stewart 12.5 points – 3rd  Johan Hellstrom 8 points – 4th  Kunal Sharma 6.5 points
 Event 5 – International Skids: On the first skid, Great Briton Jamie Quarry went the full 60 meters in 14.65 seconds setting a new world record but Jamaican Leeman Stewart slipped. On the second skid, Swede Johan Hellstrom went the full 60 meters in 14.03 seconds breaking Quarry's world record but Indian Kunal Sharma slipped while Great Briton Jamie Quarry once again went the full 60 meters but this time at 13.07 seconds shattering Hellstrom's world record while Jamaican Leeman Stewart went 50.70 meters. On the third skid, Swede Johan Hellstrom went 58.88 meters but Indian Kunal Sharma once again slipped while Great Briton Jamie Quarry once more went the full 60 meters but this time 12.79 seconds shattering his own world record while Jamaican Leeman Stewart fell off.
 Result after 5 events: 1st  Jamie Quarry 17 points – 2nd  Leeman Stewart 14.5 points – 3rd  Johan Hellstrom 11 points – 4th  Kunal Sharma 7.5 points

Episode 5 – Heat 5
 Original airdate: 
 Viewership: 
 Contestants: 

  Event 1 – 110m Underhurdles:In lane one was Frenchman Luc Vansevenant and in lane two was Australian Chris Norton and in lane three was Great Briton Liam Collins and in lane four was American Cory McGee. From the gun, Vansevenant, Norton and Collins were neck and neck until Vansevenant who only just avoided knocking the fourth hurdle down stumbled on the fifth hurdle getting himself disqualified leaving Norton and Collins battling it out for the finish. Norton who only just avoided knocking the final hurdle down won the race with a time of 20.84 seconds with Collins following him in second with a time of ?.? seconds and McGee coming third with a time of ?.? seconds.
 110m Underhurdles result: 1st  Chris Norton 20.84 seconds – 2nd  Liam Collins 21.25 seconds – 3rd  Luc Vansevenant 28.84 seconds – 4th  Cory McGee 32.81 seconds
 After 1 event: 1st  Chris Norton 4 points – 2nd  Liam Collins 3 points – 3rd  Luc Vansevenant 2 points – 4th  Cory McGee 1 point
 Event 2 – Men's Individual Fall Down: From left to right, Frenchman Luc Vansevenant, Australian Chris Norton, Great Briton Liam Collins and American Cory McGee. In the first shot, Collins landed first with Norton landing seconds and Vansevenant landing third and McGee landing last eliminating him. In the second shot, Collins landed first with Vansevenant landing second and Norton landing last eliminating him. In the third and final shot, Vansevenant landed faster than Collins.
 Men's Individual Fall Down result: 1st  Luc Vansevenant 4 – 2nd  Liam Collins 3 – 3rd  Chris Norton 2 – 4th  Cory McGee 1
 After 2 events: Three way tie for first  Liam Collins,  Chris Norton and  Luc Vansevenant all on 6 points – 4th  Cory McGee 2 points
 Event 3 – Underwater Shot Put: American Cory McGee threw his ball at a distance of 3.04 meters on the first attempt and 3.46 meters on the second attempt and 3.08 meters on the third attempt. On the second attempt, Great Briton Liam Collins threw his ball at a distance of 3.77 meters while Frenchman Luc Vansevenant threw his ball at a distance of 3.74 meters but it only just touched the black line while Australian Chris Norton threw his ball at a distance of 3.72 meters. On the third attempt, Great Briton Liam Collins threw his ball at a distance of 3.98 meters while Frenchman Luc Vansevenant threw his ball at a distance of 3.83 meters while Australian Chris Norton threw his ball at a distance of 3.95 meters.
 Underwater Shot Put result: 1st  Liam Collins 3.98 meters – 2nd  Chris Norton 3.95 meters – 3rd  Luc Vansevenant 3.83 meters – 4th  Cory McGee 3.46 meters
 After 3 events: 1st  Liam Collins 10 points – 2nd  Chris Norton 9 points – 3rd  Luc Vansevenant 8 points – 4th  Cory McGee 3 points
 Event 4 – Short Track Lap Sprint: First up was American Cory McGee who completed the track in a time of 30.97 seconds. Next up was Frenchman Luc Vansevenant who completed the track in a time of 29.47 seconds. Next up was Great Briton Liam Collins who completed the track in a time of 30.38 seconds. Last up was Australian Chris Norton who completed the track in a time of 29.35 seconds to equal the world record.
 Short Track Lap Sprint result: 1st  Chris Norton 29.35 seconds – 2nd  Luc Vansevenant 29.47 seconds – 3rd  Liam Collins 30.38 seconds – 4th  Cory McGee 30.97 seconds
 After 4 events:  1st  Chris Norton 13 points – 2nd  Liam Collins 12 points – 3rd  Luc Vansevenant 11 points – 4th  Cory McGee 4 points
 Event 5 – Reverse Posterior Glide: On the first attempt, Great Briton Liam Collins slid down at a distance of 20.66 meters. On the second attempt, American Cory McGee who slid down at a distance of 16.20 meters on the first attempt, slid down at a distance of 23.66 meters while Frenchman Luc Vansevenant who slid down at a distance of 16.74 meters on the first attempt, slid down at a distance of 16.96 meters while Great Briton Liam Collins slid down at a distance of 23.91 meters while Australian Chris Norton who slid down at a distance of 14.12 meters on the first attempt, slid down at a distance of 19.00 meters. On the third attempt, American Cory McGee slid down at a distance of 19.36 meters while Frenchman Luc Vansevenant slid down at a distance of 15.50 meters while Great Briton Liam Collins slid down at a distance of 31.70 meters while Australian Chris Norton slid down at a distance of 15.36 meters.
 Result after 5 events: 1st  Liam Collins 16 points – 2nd  Chris Norton 15 points – 3rd  Luc Vansevenant 12 points – 4th  Cory McGee 7 points

For reasons unknown, the program was removed from the schedules part-way through the 2004 competition, and has not been shown since.

However, footage of the 2004 final (as well as a number of editions of the series) surfaced many years later on the popular video website YouTube. The winner was British athlete Jamie Quarry.

It is noted that, in one episode, one of the athletes refers to the '2003' competition, which does not exist. It is believed that this blooper is as a result of the completed 2003 series being delayed and re-edited as the 2004 series.

Broadcasting International King of Sports
The television programme of International King of Sports was produced by Endemol, and in the UK was broadcast on Five. It was presented by Helen Chamberlain and Mark Robson, with commentary from Alan Parry.

The programme won a bronze award in the Game Show category at the Montreux Television Festival in 2003.

References

External links
Article on International King of Sports from The Times

2002 British television series debuts
2004 British television series endings
Channel 5 (British TV channel) original programming
English-language television shows
Multi-sport events in the United Kingdom
Television series by Banijay